Santee Smith is a Canadian Kahnyen’kehàka (Mohawk) multidisciplinary artist, dancer, designer, producer, and choreographer of the Turtle Clan from Six Nations of the Grand River. She has used her voice and research to create dance works representing Indigenous identities. She is an advocate for Indigenous performances and is one of Canada's most dominating dance artists. Santee Smith has amassed many awards throughout her career and in 2019, she was appointed Chancellor of McMaster University in Hamilton, Ontario, Canada.

Biography

Early life and education 
Smith grew up on the Six Nations of the Grand River reserve. She is a member of the Mohawk Nation.

When Smith was three years old, she was hit by a vehicle, resulting in injuries that placed her in a body cast. That same year, she broke her other leg in a cycling accident. Smith began dancing as a form of physical therapy. At age 11, she was accepted into Canada's National Ballet School, where she trained for six years and while she did excellent in the program she never completed it, because she felt that her education there was not allowing her to connect with her Mohawk identity. She also at some time during her training was in Banff at the Aboriginal Dance Program.

Smith attended McMaster University, earning degrees in physical education and psychology. She also earned a master's degree in dance from York University in Toronto.

Artistic career 
She took a hiatus from dancing to focus on her degree but missed the creativity that dance offered so she began to choreograph dances in 1996 and created her very first dance work in 2004. She committed six years of work to it and named it Kaha:wi, which means "to carry".

In 2005 Smith founded and still serves as the artistic director and producer of Kaha:wi Dance Theatre, a Six Nations company based in Toronto. The goal of creating this dance theatre was to ignite interest into the collaboration of training, Indigenous identity, and performance. Smith's work introduces modern Haudenosaunee song and dance, and mixes it with traditional ones to bring the present and past together in a way that honours the integrity and culture of the material.

Smith also creates pottery pieces as a way to demonstrate her Indigenous identity and was recently chosen to have her work "Talking Earth", which depicts the trauma's of colonization, as permanent art piece at the Gardiner Museum. She has also had her pottery designs shown in other exhibits such as in the Woodland Cultural Centre and the National Gallery of Canada. Her families involvement in pottery dates back to her grandmother, Elda "Bun" Smith, who caught an interest in pottery after finding broken pottery pieces throughout her reserve. After researching their significance and history she found that pottery was historically a Mohawk tradition that was dissolved when colonizers came to Canada. Santee's grandmother helped revive the Mohawk tradition of pottery and passed down this tradition onto Santee's parents who now have a pottery business which Santee also works at.

Smith also uses pottery as a way to incorporate Indigenous identity into her performances. The pottery she incorporates is Indigenous made and has images and symbols that represent important aspects of Indigenous culture such as earth and how one must live in balance with it. In the production Blood Ties that she helped produce, she used a piece of pottery that her father specifically curated for the performance, as her parents are very well known Mohawk ceramic artists.  Additionally, the work that Smith creates also involves the collaboration of many Indigenous peoples. When creating her first dance Kaha:wi, she interviewed members of her reserve and family to help her create the storyline around Haudenosaunee life and ideologies as well as utilized Indigenous musicians to create the music for her production.

Santee Smith has created 14 different productions outside of the many short creations she has also been responsible for, and her productions have seen the stages of many places nationally and internationally. Her research and passion has made her into an advocate for Indigenous dramatic performances and practice by creating storylines that represent Indigenous lives. Moreover, through her works she also reconstructs the understandings of gender, specifically highlighting how colonization has impacted the way in which women are understood in Indigenous traditions. Smith shows how traditionally women within her Haudenosaunee and Mohawk culture were seen as powerful, sexually empowered, and even owners of land and uses her performances as an attempt to reclaim those identities.    

Some of the creations Smith has helped choreographed have been a 2017 Canadian Opera Company production of Louis Riel, an opera based on the story of the Métis leader Louis Riel. The same year, she designed the opening ceremony act for the North American Indigenous Games, held in Toronto. With Kaha:wi Dance Theatre, Smith created The Mush Hole: Truth, Acknowledgement, Resilience, a performance piece about the Mohawk Institute, a residential school for First Nations children that operated in Brantford, Ontario. In 2019, the show premiered at Young People's Theatre in Toronto, before embarking on a North American tour.

Chancellorship 
In 2019, Smith was named the new Chancellor of McMaster University, succeeding Suzanne Labarge as the honorary head of the university. She is the first Indigenous person to hold this position. Smith was installed into this role on November 21, 2019 and reappointed in February 2022.

Honors and awards

References 

Living people
Indigenous Canadian women
Canadian Mohawk people
Chancellors of McMaster University
McMaster University alumni
21st-century Canadian dancers
Dora Mavor Moore Award winners
Year of birth missing (living people)
Canadian female dancers
Canadian choreographers
Canadian women choreographers